Mumtaheena Chowdhury Toya (born April 24, 1991), known by her stage name as Toya, is a Bangladeshi model, dancer and television actress, who has worked in various Bengali language television dramas and serials. She has acted in many commercials as well as short films. In 2010, she was ranked fifth on the Lux Channel I Superstar.

Early life 
Mumtaheena Toya was born on April 24, 1991, in Rangamati to a Muslim family. Her family name is Mumtaheena Chowdhury Toya, but she is better known as Toya. Her father is a businessman by profession and her mother is a school teacher.

Personal life 
Toya married in her private life. She was married to her boyfriend Sayed Zaman Shawon. Shawon is also an actor by profession. She fell in love with Shawon while attending an acting training workshop in India in late 2019. She married Shawon on February 29, 2020.

Career 
Toya competed as a contestant on Lux Channel I Superstar in 2010, where she finished 5th and began her career as a model. Her acting career began with the Odekha Megher Kabya drama directed by Rumana Rashid Ishita. She later worked in many television shows, dramas, telefilms and commercials. She has also done many video songs. Toya is a brand representative of "La Reve".

Filmography

Television 
 Nine and a Half
 Shongjog Bichinno
 Odekha Megher Kabya
 Laboni (2021) (Telefilm)

Awards and honors 
 5th place in Lux Channel I Superstar (2010)

References

External links 

1991 births
Living people
21st-century Bangladeshi actresses
Bangladeshi television actresses
Bangladeshi film actresses
People from Rangamati District